The Buckingham Square Historic District is a historic district in Hartford, Connecticut. The district is located in the area around Buckingham Square Park.

The district boundaries were increased in 1982 to add one more contributing building on an  area.  The added building was designed by George Zunner and was built in 1907.

See also
National Register of Historic Places listings in Hartford, Connecticut

References

Geography of Hartford, Connecticut
Colonial Revival architecture in Connecticut
Italianate architecture in Connecticut
Historic districts in Hartford County, Connecticut
National Register of Historic Places in Hartford, Connecticut
Historic districts on the National Register of Historic Places in Connecticut